The Indian Military Nursing Services is  a part of Armed Forces Medical Services (AFMS) of the Indian Army, first formed under British rule in 1888. An officer in the Military Nursing Services is granted Permanent Commission or Short Service Commission by a Govt Gazette Notification. The list of names are published in the weekly gazette of Government of India from time to time.

History

First World War 
The Indian Army Military Nursing Service has its origin in the Army Nursing Service formed in 1888 as part of the British Army. The force went through many changes in its years of existence.  In 1893, it was designated as Indian Army Nursing Service. The force went through further changes in 1902, when the Indian Nursing Service and the Army Nursing Service were combined and on 27 March 1902, it was redesignated to Queen Alexandra's Imperial Military Nursing Service. At the outbreak of the World War in 1914 there were just fewer than 300 nurses in the QAIMNS, by the end of the war this had raised to 10,404. The Army nurses served in Flanders, the Mediterranean, the Balkans, the Middle East and onboard hospital ships. Of the 200 plus army nurses died on active service, many were Indians. After, the war on 1 October 1926, the Nursing Services was made a permanent part of British Indian Army. This date is now being celebrated as the Corps day of Military Nursing Service, though in actual its origins occurred 45 five years before (many Corps of the Army) the Army Medical Corps  also traces its origin to more than hundreds of years back in the similar way, though it was constituted in the present form in 1948.

Second World War 
With the outbreak of the Second world war, nurses once again found themselves serving all over the world, including Singapore, Burma, Italy, Mesopotamia, Ceylon, Egypt and Western Africa. The changing working conditions and wartime shortages led to changes in uniform. Khaki slacks and battledress blouses replaced the grey and scarlet ward dress and rank insignia was adopted to signify the officer status of the nurses. In the Far East, the fall of Hong Kong and Singapore led to many army nurses (including Indian) being captured by the Japanese and endured terrible hardships and deprivations of the Far East prisoner-of-war camps. During the middle of the war in 1943, the Indian arm of the Nursing Services was separated through Indian Military Nursing Service Ordinance, 1943 and redesignated, thereby constituting the Indian Military Nursing Service (IMNS). The IMNS was an auxiliary subject to the provisions of the Indian Army Act, 1911. However they were of commissioned officers ranking equally with Indian commissioned officers. This was the first time in the history of the Indian Army women were granted commissioned officer ranks.

Post Independence 
After the independence in 1950, the Government of India constituted the Military Nursing Service (MNS) by issuing Army Instruction 274/50, to set the terms and conditions of service for the grant of regular commissions in the MNS forming part of the regular Army, subject to the Army Act, 1950. The IMNS stood subsumed in the MNS as on 12 August 1950, and the auxiliary force called IMNS formally cease to exist. The MNS was constituted as an all women, all officer Corps of the Indian Army, and it remains so. On 23 November 1954 the Central Government made the Army Rules, 1954 and brought  MNS under the Army Rules along with every other Corps/ Service of the regular Army. Subsequently, on 3 January 1959, through Army Instruction 4/59, the Government of India re-designated the rank of the officers in the MNS to conform to the nomenclature used by the other officers of the regular Army. After having re-designated the rank in the MNS by the Government, the Chief of Army Staff (COAS) through Army Order 501/63 laid down that the MNS Officers are required to salute and are entitled to salutes in the manner as other Commissioned Officers of the Army. The COAS further issued Army Order 120/73; and laid down the order of precedence of the Arms/ Services and Units of the Army including the MNS. On 15 March 1982 the COAS  had cancelled the earlier Army Order 120/73 and issued Army Order 11/82 laid down the order of precedence of the Arms/ Services and Units of the Army including the MNS and the on the subject with some further additions of newly raised Corps, which is valid even today.

On 5 December 1986, the Government of India issued the Defence Service Regulations, Regulations for the Army, 1987 for the administration of the regular Army. The said regulations addresses the MNS as a Corps/Service, and stated that officers in the MNS are Army Officers and will rank equally with male officers of the same titular rank, and on 5 December 1993, the Government of India amended the Army Rules 1954 and inserted the Rule 16A dealing with the retirement of officers of the regular Army from all Corps/ Services including the MNS.

Now, the Military Nursing Service is an integral part of the Armed Forces Medical Services (AFMS). The AFMS consists of Army Medical Corps (AMC), Army Dental Corps (ADC) and the Military Nursing Service (MNS). The AFMS personnel serve in the medical establishments of Army, Navy and Air Force. The women officers in the MNS were treated as under dogs since the inception of AFMS in 1948 (the AMC and AD Corps are more or less equally positioned). After independence, the Officers of MNS have not only served in India but have also played a role in United Nations peace keeping missions abroad in UN missions to Lebanon, Cambodia, Somalia and scores of other Nations. Many of such missions are still active.

Rank structure

The various ranks of the Military Nursing Service are listed below in descending order: Commissioned Officers
Major General
Brigadier
Colonel
Lieutenant Colonel
Major
Captain
Lieutenant

Presently there are no personnel equivalent to JCOs/OR  in the  Military Nursing Service. Other para-medical personnel such as Nursing Assistants and Ambulance Assistants are part of Army Medical Corps.

See also

AIM:The aim of Military Nursing Service is to provide medical care to the hospitalized soldiers and their dependents in peace and field locations and to take care of their health.

References

External links
Official website

Administrative corps of the Indian Army
Army medical administrative corps
Military units and formations established in 1950